Nola is both a surname and a given name. Notable people with the name include:

Surname 
 Aaron Nola (born 1993), American baseball player
 Austin Nola (born 1989), American baseball player
 Giovanni da Nola (1478–1559), Italian Renaissance sculptor and architect
 Giovanni Domenico da Nola (c. 1510 to 1520-1592), Italian Renaissance composer and poet
 Lukas Nola (born 1964), Croatian film director
 Pavlina Nola (born 1974), retired tennis player
 R'Bonney Nola (born 1994), Filipino-American beauty pageant titleholder, model, and fashion designer. Winner of Miss USA 2022 and Miss Universe 2022

Given name 
 Nola Barber (1901–1985), first woman mayor of Chelsea City, Australia
 Nola Barron (born 1931), New Zealand potter
 Nola Blake (born c. 1952), Australian woman sentenced to death in Thailand for drug trafficking; sentence later commuted
 Nola Fairbanks (born 1924), Broadway actress
Nola Ishmael (born 1943), Barbadian nurse
 Nola Marino (born 1954), member of the Australian Parliament
 Nola Rae (born 1950), Australian mime artist

Other 
 Nola (rhinoceros), a female rhinoceros at the San Diego Zoo

See also

Nela (name)